Kwinana may refer to:

 City of Kwinana, a local government area in Western Australia
 Electoral district of Kwinana, an electorate of the Western Australian Legislative Assembly
 Kwinana Beach, Western Australia, a suburb in Western Australia
 Kwinana Desalination Plant
 Kwinana Freeway, a major road in Western Australia
 Kwinana Grain Terminal, a grain terminal in East Rockingham, Western Australia
 Kwinana Power Station, a coal power station
 Kwinana railway station, a station of the Mandurah Line
 Kwinana Town Centre, Western Australia, a suburb in Western Australia
 SS Kwinana, a ship that was driven ashore at Kwinana Beach in 1922